Tauno Lindgren (4 December 1911 – 25 June 1991) was a Finnish cyclist. He competed in the individual road race event at the 1936 Summer Olympics.

References

External links
 

1911 births
1991 deaths
Finnish male cyclists
Olympic cyclists of Finland
Cyclists at the 1936 Summer Olympics
People from Kemi
Sportspeople from Lapland (Finland)